Aminpur is a village in Jatsakhni Union of Bera Upazila in Pabna District of Bangladesh. It is now in under Aminpur Thana. It is located on the banks of the Attrai River, along national highway N5 between Kazirhat Launch Terminal and Kashinathpur. According to the 2011 Bangladesh census, it had 962 households and a population of 4,130. The postal code is 6682.

In May 2013, the National Implementation Committee for Administrative Reforms (NICAR) decided to upgrade Aminpur Investigation Centre into a full police station covering eight unions of the upazila. The police station opened in October 2013. Aminpur has one secondary school, Aminpur Ayen Uddin High School, founded in 1967, which serves 1,000 students.

See also
List of villages in Bangladesh

References

External links
 Upazila map: Upazila Bera, District Pabna (look between Puran Bharenga and Ruppur),

Populated places in Pabna District
Villages in Rajshahi Division
Villages in Pabna District